Ann G. Rabbitt (born December 20, 1960) is a Republican politician from the State of New York. Rabbitt currently has served as Orange County Clerk since 2014.

Career 
Rabbitt served as a trustee for the village of Greenwood Lake from 1999 to 2002. From 2002 to 2005, she served on the Warwick Town Board. In 2005, she became a member of the New York State Assembly and served in this role until 2013.

In 2013, she was elected to the position of Orange County Clerk. In 2018, Rabbitt was the Republican candidate for New York State Senate in Senate District 42, but was defeated by Democrat Jen Metzger.

Personal life 
Rabbitt's husband, former Greenwood Lake Chief of Police Robert "Bobby" Rabbitt Jr., died on February 26, 2017, at the age of 57.

References

Living people
Place of birth missing (living people)
Republican Party members of the New York State Assembly
Politicians from Orange County, New York
Women state legislators in New York (state)
1960 births
21st-century American politicians
21st-century American women politicians